His Highness Love is a 1931 Franco-German comedy film directed by Robert Péguy, Erich Schmidt and Joe May. It stars Annabella, André Alerme and Roger Tréville and was made in Berlin as the French-language version of Her Majesty the Barmaid.

The film's sets were designed by the art directors Andrej Andrejew and Erich Kettelhut.

Cast
 Annabella as Annette Wéber
 André Alerme as Jules Leroy
 Roger Tréville as Fred Leroy
 André Lefaur as Le baron Ducharme
 Charles Prince as Ernest
 Marie-Laure as La grand-mère
 Gretl Theimer as Monique
 André Dubosc as Emile
 Andrée Berty
 Raymond Galle
 Henri Richard
 Robert Tourneur

References

Bibliography

External links 
 

1931 films
Films of the Weimar Republic
German comedy films
1931 comedy films
1930s French-language films
Films directed by Joe May
Films directed by Robert Péguy
German multilingual films
Films produced by Joe May
Films scored by Bronisław Kaper
German black-and-white films
1931 multilingual films
1930s German films